is a Japanese tarento, actress and former idol singer. She is known as a member of the idol group C.C. Girls. She is now represented by Great Den.

She is married to the singer Koji Tamaki.

Discography

As Tenko

Mini albums

As Bubble Aota

Singles

DVD

E-books

Photo albums

Filmography

Variety

TV dramas

Internet

Films

References

Notes

External links
 
 
 

Japanese television personalities
Japanese actresses
Actors from Ehime Prefecture
1967 births
Living people
Musicians from Ehime Prefecture